Porcellio nigrogranulatus is a species of woodlouse in the genus Porcellio belonging to the family Porcellionidae that can be found on Balearic Islands and mainland Spain.

References

Crustaceans described in 1892
Woodlice of Europe
Endemic fauna of Spain
Porcellionidae